The 1937–38 FAW Welsh Cup is the 57th season of the annual knockout tournament for competitive football teams in Wales.

Key
League name pointed after clubs name.
B&DL - Birmingham & District League
CCL - Cheshire County League
FL D2 - Football League Second Division
FL D3N - Football League Third Division North
FL D3S - Football League Third Division South
MWL - Mid-Wales Football League
ML - Midland League
SFL - Southern Football League
WLN - Welsh League North
WLS D1 - Welsh League South Division One
WCL - West Cheshire League
W&DL - Wrexham & District Amateur League

First round

Second round
20 winners from the first round plus Haverfordwest Athletic and Lovell’s Athletic.

Third round
10 winners from the second round plus 14 new clubs. Llanelly get a bye to the fourth round.

Fourth round
12 winners from the third round, Llanelly and one new team - Worcester City.

Fifth round
Four winners from the fourth round. Cheltenham Town, Shrewsbury Town and Worcester City get a bye to the Sixth round.

Sixth round
Two winners from the fifth round, Cheltenham Town, Shrewsbury Town and Worcester City and eleven new clubs.

Seventh round

Semifinal
Swansea Town and Rhyl played at Chester.

Final
Both final and replay were held in Shrewsbury.

External links
The FAW Welsh Cup

1937-38
Wales
Cup